Canal 2 is a Nicaraguan free-to-air television network owned by Televicentro de Nicaragua, S.A.

History 
Televicentro de Nicaragua, S.A. was founded in December 1965 by Octavio Sacasa Sarria and started broadcasting in March 1966. It was the third television channel in Nicaragua after Channel 6, owned by the Somoza family. Televicentro started broadcasting in colour in 1973.

With the triumph of the Sandinista revolution in July 1979, Channel 2 together with Channel 6 were expropriated by the Sandinista government and turned into the Sistema Sandinista de Televisión (SSTV), the Sandinista Television System. Channel 2 returned to its original owners at the end of 1989.

In 1996, Channel 2 became the first Central American TV channel to have an official web site. Canal 2 also broadcasts from relay-transmitter channel 7 in some parts of the country.

In 2005, Televicentro signed an agreement with Channel 33 from Costa Rica to broadcast the evening transmissions of Noticiero 22-22 in that country.

In 2006, the channel started streaming broadcasts.

In late 2011, Octavio Sacasa said that "the channel is not for sale", amid rising concerns that Televicentro's sale to Albavisión was finalized, as other versions of the same story have been circulating in business circles, about alleged advanced negotiations between Sacasa and Ángel González. González and Sacasa were business partners in the USA in the 80s, until becoming arch-rivals in the early 90s, when Sacasa reassumed control of Televicentro.

In 2014, the channel's news operation (TVNoticias) was taken over by Maurice Ortega, aligning it with the government's viewpoint.

Programming 
As of April 2022:

Newscasts 
 TVN Noticias – with a half-hour edition at 6:30 a.m., three hour-long editions editions at 1:00 p.m., 6:00 p.m. and 6:00 p.m. and with short bulletins on weekends.
 Newscasts from CNN en Español
 Noticiero Univision

Foreign soap operas
 Soy Luna
 Estrella de Amor
 Loquito Por Ti
 Diseñando tu amor
 La Gloria de Lucho
 Nuevo Sol
 Dulce ambición
 Querer sin límites

Foreign TV Series 
 Revenge
 Numbers
 Flashpoint
 Mentes Criminales

Kids 
 Imported TV series mostly from the Disney and Studio 100 catalogs

Original productions 
 Luces, cámara y sazón desde tu cocina

Special Events 
 Miss Mundo Nicaragua

Former programming

Local
 Nicaragua en directo – with editions on afternoon during Sundays
 La Mañana de la 2 
 Espetaculos Televicentro 
 NTD 
 Domingo Fantastico

Imported
 Patitomanía – Kids programming block (2008)
 La mujer de Judas
 Pasión Prohibida
 Las Bandidas
 Dueña y Señora
 Violetta
 La Tormenta
 Cuento encantado
 Flor de Caribe
 El Señor de los Cielos
 Documentales BBC
 Diarios de Vampiros 
 GLEE 
 Cuello Blanco 
 Familia Moderna 
 La Doble Vida de Chuck
 Contra corriente (serie)

References

External links 
 Televicentro Canal 2 official website

Television stations in Nicaragua
Spanish-language television stations
Television channels and stations established in 1966